Kart Food Industries Sdn Bhd (doing business as Kart's) is a Malaysian halal-certified frozen food suppliers company established since 1988, specialising in Malaysian cultures food and Western-snacks. The company started as a small home-based industry and now expands globally. It is one of the Malaysia's largest chilled and frozen snacks companies.

History 
Kart's is founded by a Malay couple on 26 November 1983 and began commercial in 1988 who then sold their business to a German conglomerate Dr. Oetker in 1998. Rudolf August Oetker made a substantial investment by upgrading the factory and operations as well introducing a food standard on the brand that was internationally accepted in food manufacturing. In 2002, Oetker sold the company to Amtek Berhad, a listed company in Bursa Malaysia. Kart's was then owned by Meriah Saujana and in June 2010, Kart Food Industries became a 45%-associate of FFM SMI Sdn Bhd, a wholly owned subsidiary of FFM Berhad. Although the ownership of the company continuously being changed, the original company name still been keep until this day as it borrowed the name of the wife of the founder, 'Kartini' who was instrumental in creating Kart's roti canai (a Malaysian hand tossed layered flatbread). It had export products to Brunei, Singapore as well Canada, United States, Australia, South Africa, and now into Vietnam, France, Indonesia, Myanmar, United Kingdom, United Arab Emirates and Ireland.

Products 
Kart's wide product range are processed and packed in two manufacturing centres in Shah Alam, Selangor and Kota Bharu, Kelantan. These frozen food products include roti canai, roti prata, pau, pizza, donuts, murtabak, crispy finger foods and steam buns.

Further reading 
 The  of Malaysian experience for the world palate  (PDF) Halal Industry Development Corporation

See also 

 List of frozen food brands
 Malaysian cuisine

References

External links 
 

1988 establishments in Malaysia
Frozen food brands
Privately held companies of Malaysia
Malaysian cuisine
Malaysian brands
Manufacturing companies established in 1988
Malaysian companies established in 1988